The Moderate Resolution Imaging Spectroradiometer (MODIS) is a satellite-based sensor used for earth and climate measurements. There are two MODIS sensors in Earth orbit: one on board the Terra (EOS AM) satellite, launched by NASA in 1999; and one on board the Aqua (EOS PM) satellite, launched in 2002. MODIS has now been replaced by the VIIRS, which first launched in 2011 aboard the Suomi NPP satellite.

The MODIS instruments were built by Santa Barbara Remote Sensing. They capture data in 36 spectral bands ranging in wavelength from 0.4 μm to 14.4 μm and at varying spatial resolutions (2 bands at 250 m, 5 bands at 500 m and 29 bands at 1 km). Together the instruments image the entire Earth every 1 to 2 days. They are designed to provide measurements in large-scale global dynamics including changes in Earth's cloud cover, radiation budget and processes occurring in the oceans, on land, and in the lower atmosphere. 

Support and calibration is provided by the MODIS characterization support team (MCST).

Applications 

With its high temporal resolution although low spatial resolution, MODIS data are useful to track changes in the landscape over time. Examples of such applications are the monitoring of vegetation health by means of time-series analyses with vegetation indices, long term land cover changes (e.g. to monitor deforestation rates), global snow cover trends, water inundation from pluvial, riverine, or sea level rise flooding in coastal areas, change of water levels of major lakes such as the Aral Sea, and the detection and mapping of wildland fires in the United States. The United States Forest Service's Remote Sensing Applications Center analyzes MODIS imagery on a continuous basis to provide information for the management and suppression of wildfires.

Specifications

Calibration
MODIS utilizes four on-board calibrators in addition to the space view in order to provide in-flight calibration: solar diffuser (SD), solar diffuser stability monitor (SDSM), spectral radiometric calibration assembly (SRCA), and a v-groove black body. MODIS has used the marine optical buoy for vicarious calibration.

MODIS bands

MODIS data

MODIS Level 3 datasets 

The following MODIS Level 3 (L3) datasets are available from NASA, as processed by the Collection 5 software.

Availability 

Raw MODIS data stream can be received in real-time using a tracking antenna, due to the instrument's direct broadcast capability.

Alternatively, the scientific data are made available to the public via several World Wide Web sites and FTP archives, such as:
 ECHO Reverb – the next generation metadata and service discovery tool, which has replaced the former Warehouse Inventory and Search Tool (WIST);
 LAADS Web – Level 1 and Atmosphere Archive and Distribution System (LAADS) web interface;
 LANCE-MODIS – Land Atmosphere Near real-time Capability for EOS
 ftp://ladsftp.nascom.nasa.gov/ – LAADS underlying FTP server;
 http://e4ftl01.cr.usgs.gov/ – Earth land surface datasets;
 ftp://n4ftl01u.ecs.nasa.gov/ – snow and ice datasets.

Most of the data are available in the HDF-EOS format — a variant of Hierarchical Data Format prescribed for the data derived from Earth Observing System missions.

See also
Imaging spectroscopy
NASA World Wind
Aqua (satellite)
Terra (satellite)

References

External links

Official NASA site
MODIS bands and spectral ranges (broken link) (archived 15 July 2007)
MODIS Images of the Day
 MODIS Image of the Day – Google Gadget referring to MODIS image of the day.
Gallery of Images of Interest (archived 25 August 2001)
MODIS Land Product Subsetting Tool for North America from Oak Ridge National Laboratory (archived 27 May 2010)
MODIS Rapid Response system (near real time images)
NASA OnEarth (Web service for MODIS imagery) (archived 12 July 2003)
Visible Earth: Latest MODIS images (archived 1 July 2006)
MODIS Sinusoidal: Projection 6842 – MODIS Sinusoidal
Python: accessing near real-time MODIS images and fire data from NASA's Aqua and Terra satellites (Python)

Satellite imaging sensors
NASA
Modis has 36 spectral bands